The Universal Pantheist Society is one of the world's first official organizations dedicated to the promotion and understanding of modern pantheism. The Society does not require its members to hold to any particular creed about Pantheism and recognizes that there are a variety of beliefs that fall under the title pantheism. The Society encourages individuals in finding ways of spiritual practice in keeping with the general spirit of pantheism. Its motto is We seek renewed reverence for the Earth and a vision of Nature as the ultimate context for human existence...

Background 
The Universal Pantheist Society seeks to bring together Pantheists of various traditions and understandings, believing that standing together can help create a stronger community and provide greater intellectual stimulation for its participants.  

The Society, founded in 1975, was the first organization to recognize Pantheism as a religion (organized under U.S. 501(c)(3) statutes). It is a membership organization that has been serving Pantheists worldwide since 1975. The UPS social networking site welcomes all varieties of pantheists, religious naturalists, eco-humanists and other like-minded advocates.

Pantheism (Gr. pan=all, theos=God), is the title used to denote any paradigm that postulates 'God is all' Pantheism identifies the Universe (Nature) with God.  Various forms of pantheism have religious foundations; others have been based upon naturalistic, scientific, or poetic points of view.

Pantheist Vision publication 
The Society is overseen by a Board of Directors and publishes a Journal, Pantheist Vision, which presents articles relating to the modern philosophy and practice of pantheism. Edited by Society co-founder Harold Wood, the Journal, a quarterly publication, features member-submitted articles, personal interpretations of pantheism from both members and notable figures, book reviews and essays by the editor . There are also occasionally special publications a recommended Pantheist reading list and book store.

See also
List of pantheists
Naturalistic pantheism

References

External links
Official website
 Pantheist Awareness Network
 Pantheist Association for Nature

Pantheist organizations